Roland de Mecquenem (20 August 1877 – 1957) was a French archaeologist who took part in the excavations of Susa in Iran.
He was a graduate of the École des Mines.

From 1913 to 1946 he was the director of excavations of the Mission Archéologique de Susiane at Susa. In 1935 he discovered the ancient Elamite complex at Chogha Zanbil. In Persia he excavated numerous artifacts, many of which were sent to the Louvre in Paris.

Selected works 
 Céramique peinte de Suze et petits monuments de l'époque archaïque (with Edmond Pottier). 1912.
 Mission en Susiane (with Jean-Vincent Scheil) 1935.
 Archéologie susienne, 1943-47. 
 Recherches à Tchogha Zembil, 1953.

See also
 Petit chien à bélière

References

External links

French archaeologists
French Iranologists
1877 births
1957 deaths
People from Orléans